CSK VVS Samara (lit. Central Sports Club of the Air Force, Samara) are a professional ice hockey team based in Samara, Samara Oblast, Russia. They are currently playing in the Supreme Hockey League, the second level of Russian ice hockey.

CSK were affiliated with HC Lada Togliatti during their tenure in the Kontinental Hockey League. Following Lada's demotion to the VHL at the conclusion of the 2017–18 season, VVS Samara agreed to become the primary affiliate to HC Neftekhimik Nizhnekamsk of the KHL from the 2018–19 season.

References

External links
 

Ice hockey teams in Russia
Sport in Samara, Russia